Lujendra Ojha (b. 1990 ) is an American planetary scientist. He, as an undergraduate under the direction of planetary geologist Alfred McEwen, discovered compelling evidence that water on Mars includes current, seasonal, surface liquid brine flows. He is current an assistant professor of planetary science at Rutgers University. He has also played in a heavy metal band, Gorkha.

Awards
Special Recognition — Office of the Governor. Douglas A. Ducey (Governor, AZ)
National Science Foundation (2015) — Research Excellence Award
Lunar and Planetary Institute (2013) — Team-X Merit Award
University of Arizona (2012) — First Place in Physical Science Research. Annual Student Showcase.
University of Arizona (2011) — Honorary Presidents Award
Group Achievement Award: HiRISE Science Team, NASA (2011)

References

External links
 Lujendra Ojha – Who Discovered Evidence of Water on Mars

Planetary scientists
Georgia Tech alumni
Nepalese emigrants to the United States
American people of Nepalese descent
American scientists
1990 births
Living people